Boy Kill Boy were an English rock band based in Leytonstone, East London. The band produced two studio albums and six singles before splitting in 2008. Their highest charting single was "Suzie", which reached #17 in the UK singles chart in 2006.

History
Before forming Boy Kill Boy, Chris Peck, Pete Carr and Shaz Mahmood were in a band called Future of Junior and produced a few songs including a track called "Miss Scandinavia". In May 2005, Boy Kill Boy released their debut single "Suzie" for record label Fierce Panda. In the summer the band opened the Radio 1 stage on Sunday/Friday of the 2005 Reading and Leeds Festivals. Their second single followed later that year through Fallout Records, a subsidiary of Island Records. "Civil Sin" was featured as Zane Lowe's "Hottest Track In The World Today". 

In 2005, Boy Kill Boy signed to Vertigo Records. In 2006, the single "Back Again" reached No. 26 in the UK Singles Chart, which earned them a slot on Top of the Pops, and the re-release of "Suzie" reached No. 17. Their debut album Civilian was released in the UK on 22 May 2006 and entered the UK Albums Chart at No. 16. The album was released in North America on 25 July 2006, where it reached No. 11 on Billboard's Top Heatseekers chart.

In May 2005, the band stepped in to replace Nine Black Alps on the NME New Music Tour 2005 after the band's frontman Sam Forrest caught the mumps. Boy Kill Boy had only been billed to play one support slot on the tour but ended up playing numerous extra slots supporting Maxïmo Park, The Cribs and The Rakes. They returned the following year as headliners for NME's New Bands Tour 2006, supported by The Automatic, ¡Forward, Russia!, and The Long Blondes. Boy Kill Boy's "Suzie", was US iTunes Single of The Week in March 2006, this was followed with a US tour supporting The Charlatans and Echo & the Bunnymen.

Boy Kill Boy opened the Radio 1 / NME stage at Reading and Leeds Festival in 2005, and returned in 2006 to play higher up the bill. In October 2006 the band played an extensive UK Headline tour. On 7 November 2006, they supported Feeder for one of their dates in aid of War Child at the Camden Roundhouse. This was also in conjunction with the "Shoot Me Down" single, released for the charity.

In 2006 the band performed a cover of Nelly Furtado's "Maneater" for BBC Radio 1's Live Lounge.

The Fierce Panda release of "Suzie" appeared on the soundtrack of the street football video game FIFA Street 2, released in winter 2006 by Electronic Arts. "Civil Sin" appeared on the soundtrack to the FIFA 07 football video game. Also, their single "Back Again" appears in the Test Drive Unlimited videogame.

Boy Kill Boy recorded their second album in Los Angeles with Oasis producer Dave Sardy, and returned with the limited edition single "No Conversation" on 5 November 2007. The album, entitled Stars and the Sea, was released on 31 March 2008. However, the album failed to repeat the success of their debut, and rumours of a split began surfacing. On 12 October 2008, Boy Kill Boy confirmed this via an announcement on their MySpace site.

Singer Chris Peck subsequently started a new project and, on 11 January 2011, posted a video clip on YouTube for a new song called "Riversong".  Peter Carr went on to play keyboards in singer-songwriter Marina and the Diamond's backing band.

The band briefly reformed for two gigs at Oslo, Hackney, London, on 19 November 2016 and 25 November 2016.

Members
Chris Peck (lead vocals, guitar)
Kevin Chase (bass guitar, vocals)
Peter Carr (keyboards)
Shaz Mahmood (drums)

Discography

Studio albums

Singles

References

External links
Boy Kill Boy.com
Official Boy Kill Boy Myspace
Official Site @ Island Records (USA)

English indie rock groups
Musical groups from the London Borough of Waltham Forest
English pop music groups
Musical groups established in 2004
Sony Music Publishing artists
Island Records artists
Vertigo Records artists
Musical groups disestablished in 2008
Universal Music Group artists